Dennis Baddeley (1 May 1921  – May 2006) was an English professional rugby league footballer who played in the 1940s and 1950s.

Background
Dennis Baddeley was born in Castleford, West Riding of Yorkshire, his birth was registered in Pontefract district, and he died aged 85.

Playing career

County Honours
Dennis Baddeley was selected for Yorkshire County XIII whilst at Wakefield Trinity during the 1945/46 season.

Challenge Cup Final appearances
Dennis Baddeley played , i.e. number 5, in Wakefield Trinity's 13–12 victory over Wigan in the 1946 Challenge Cup Final during the 1945–46 season at Wembley Stadium, London on Saturday 4 May 1946, in front of a crowd of 54,730.

County Cup Final appearances
Dennis Baddeley played , i.e. number 5, in Wakefield Trinity's 2–5 defeat by Bradford Northern in the 1945 Yorkshire County Cup Final during the 1945–46 season at Thrum Hall, Halifax on Saturday 3 November 1945, and played  in the 10–0 victory over Hull F.C. in the 1946 Yorkshire County Cup Final during the 1946–47 season at Headingley Rugby Stadium, Leeds on Saturday 31 November 1946.

Club career
Dennis Baddeley made his début for Wakefield Trinity during September 1943, he made his début for Featherstone Rovers on Saturday 17 April 1943,
he appears to have scored no drop-goals (or field-goals as they are currently known in Australasia), but prior to the 1974–75 season all goals, whether; conversions, penalties, or drop-goals, scored 2-points, consequently prior to this date drop-goals were often not explicitly documented, therefore '0' drop-goals may indicate drop-goals not recorded, rather than no drop-goals scored. In addition, prior to the 1949–50 season, the archaic field-goal was also still a valid means of scoring points.

Contemporaneous Article Extract
Born in Castleford, he signed for Wakefield Trinity in 1943 after some successful work with Glass Houghton Intermediates. He soon became a leading try-scorer in Trinity's immediate post-war side and gained Yorkshire County recognition.

Genealogical information
Dennis Baddeley was the eldest brother of the rugby league  who played in the 1950s for Wakefield Trinity; Peter Baddeley.

References

External links

Search for "Baddeley" at rugbyleagueproject.org
Tributes paid to a 'class act'
Trinity stars come out for Squadbuilder

1921 births
2006 deaths
Castleford Tigers players
English rugby league players
Featherstone Rovers players
Rugby league wingers
Rugby league players from Castleford
Wakefield Trinity players
Yorkshire rugby league team players